The following lists events that happened in 2001 in Libya.

Incumbents
President: Muammar al-Gaddafi
Prime Minister: Imbarek Shamekh 

 
Years of the 21st century in Libya
Libya
Libya
2000s in Libya